The 2000–01 All-Ireland Senior Club Football Championship was the 31st staging of the All-Ireland Senior Club Football Championship since its establishment by the Gaelic Athletic Association in 1970-71. The championship began on 1 October 2000 and ended on 17 March 2001.

Crossmaglen Rangers entered the championship as the defending champions, however, they were beaten by Castleblayney in the Ulster Club Championship.

On 16 April 2001, Crossmolina Deel Rovers won the championship following a 0-16 to 1-12 defeat of Nemo Rangers in the All-Ireland final at Croke Park. It remains their only championship title.

Results

Connacht Senior Club Football Championship

Quarter-final

Semi-finals

Final

Leinster Senior Club Football Championship

First round

Quarter-finals

Semi-finals

Final

Munster Senior Club Football Championship

Quarter-finals

Semi-finals

Final

Ulster Senior Club Football Championship

Preliminary round

Quarter-finals

Semi-finals

Final

All-Ireland Senior Club Football Championship

Quarter-final

Semi-finals

Final

Championship statistics

Top scorers

Overall

In a single game

Miscellaneous

 O'Hanrahan's won the Leinster Club Championship for the first time in their history.

References

2000 in Gaelic football
2001 in Gaelic football